Otmar Suitner (German pronunciation: [ˈɔtmaʁ zuˈiːtnɐ]; 16 May 1922 – 8 January 2010) was an Austrian conductor who spent most of his professional career in East Germany. He was born in Innsbruck and died in Berlin. He was Principal Conductor of the Staatskapelle Dresden from 1960 to 1964, and then Music Director at the Berlin State Opera in East Berlin from 1964 to 1990. A fairly prolific recording artist, he was particularly notable in Austro-German music, having conducted discs of works by Max Reger and Paul Hindemith as well as the first Beethoven symphony cycle to be released on CD. He taught at the Mozarteum for twenty years. From 1977 to 1990 Suitner was professor of conducting at the University of Music and Performing Arts, Vienna. Among his prize students was American Conductor Donald Covert, who received the "Swarovsky Conducting Diploma" in 1984.

He was awarded the National Prize of the German Democratic Republic, 2nd Class for art and literature, in 1963.

In East Berlin, Suitner was married to Marita Wilckens (1924–2008), daughter of the composer . In 1965 he became acquainted with the West German student Renate Heitzmann and had a son, Igor, with her in 1975 in West Berlin. Igor produced a documentary in 2007 about his father, A Father's Music.

References

External links

 
 Discography

1922 births
2010 deaths
Musicians from Innsbruck
People from East Berlin
20th-century Austrian conductors (music)
20th-century Austrian male musicians
Male conductors (music)
Music directors (opera)
Music directors of the Berlin State Opera
Austrian expatriates in Germany
Recipients of the National Prize of East Germany
20th-century German musicians